Androstanolone benzoate (brand names Ermalone-Amp, Hermalone, Sarcosan), also known as stanolone benzoate or dihydrotestosterone benzoate (DHTB), as well as 5α-androstan-17β-ol-3-one 17β-benzoate, is a synthetic androgen and anabolic steroid and a dihydrotestosterone ester. It is used as an injectable and acts as a prodrug of androstanolone (stanolone, dihydrotestosterone, DHT).

See also
 List of androgen esters § Dihydrotestosterone esters

References

Androgens and anabolic steroids
Androstanes
Benzoate esters
Dihydrotestosterone esters
Prodrugs